Krysten Moore (born November 22, 1989) is from Mahwah, New Jersey and is the founder of "S.H.I.N.E." (Students Helping Instill New Esteem), the winner of the 2007 Miss Teen New Jersey International pageant, the 2008 National American Miss New Jersey Teen pageant, and is the National Youth Ambassador  and spokesperson for Love Our Children USA and STOMP Out Bullying.

Bullied past
Bullied in her youth because of her weight, she went on to founded S.H.I.N.E. as a means to educate others as to the harmful effects of bullying and how to overcome its effects. Through her organization she has been able to speak to thousands of students worldwide. As an honor student at Immaculate Heart Academy recognized by the 2004/2005 Who's Who Among American High School Students, she entered the Miss Teen International pageant, received the "Congeniality Award", and was chosen "Miss Teen New Jersey International". She is now the  National Bully Prevention spokesperson for Love Our Children USA and has accumulated more than 15,000 hours of community service by volunteering with organizations such as Habitat for Humanity MDA and the Juvenile Diabetes Research Fund. She has been featured on national and local TV, including the Rachael Ray Show, CBS Early Show, Access Hollywood, Good Day Street Talk, New Jersey News 12, New Jersey FIOS News One, MTV Documentary Bullied, Cake Boss and rang the NASDAQ closing bell.

Moore participated as a special presenter on the subject of bullying at the 3rd and 14th Annual New York State Cyber Security Awareness Conference in Albany, New York. Moore also presented at JLBC Star Power Convention and the Los Angeles County Boys and Girls Club TEEN SUMMIT. She was also a guest speaker at the Victoria's Secret Fashion Show Viewing Party, a presenter at one of President Obama's 100 Youth Roundtables, speaker at Kellogg K's and Allies. Moore has won numerous volunteer awards for her dedication to community service including the 2007 President Bush's Gold Medal of Service, 2008 President Obama's Lifetime Call to Service Award, and the President Obama's Gold Medal of Service in 2010, 2013, and 2014. She was recently nominated for induction into the New Jersey's Governor's Hall of Heroes.

Pageant history
Krysten has been involved in the pageant circuit for several years and won Miss South Jersey 2010, Miss Columbus Day 2011, Miss Bergen County 2012, Miss Gateway 2013 which enabled her to compete for Miss New Jersey. Moore is actively fundraising for S.H.I.N.E, Children's Miracle Network, STOMP Out Bullying, and Love Our Children USA.

Krysten took 2nd place in the national Glamour Shots Model Search modeling contest, and hosts a bi-weekly radio show segment called Kudos from Krysten with the Under Review Radio Show. In 2012 Krysten became one of the newest members of the Boston Bruins Ice Girl Team where she cheers on the team and interacts with fans at the TD Garden in Boston.

References

1989 births
Living people
Immaculate Heart Academy alumni
People from Mahwah, New Jersey
Miss International (USA) delegates
American beauty pageant winners